Enispe may refer to:

Enispe (Ενίσπη), an ancient city in Arcadia, Greece
Enispe (butterfly), a butterfly genus from Southeast Asia including:
Enispe cycnus, the blue caliph
Enispe euthymius, the red caliph
Enispe intermedia